Benjamin Kroposki is an electrical engineer at the National Renewable Energy Laboratory in Golden, Colorado. He was named a Fellow of the Institute of Electrical and Electronics Engineers (IEEE) in 2014 for his work with renewable and distributed energy systems integration in the electric power system.

References

External links

20th-century births
Living people
American electrical engineers
Fellow Members of the IEEE
Year of birth missing (living people)
Place of birth missing (living people)